Alicia Emma Payne (born 24 July 1982) is an Australian politician who has been a member of the House of Representatives since the 2019 federal election. She is a member of the Australian Labor Party (ALP) and represents the Division of Canberra in the Australian Capital Territory (ACT).

Early life
Payne was born in Canberra. She attended Kambah High School before going on to study economics at the University of Sydney. Before entering politics she worked at the National Centre For Social And Economic Modelling (NATSEM) and at the Department of the Treasury.

Politics
Payne joined the Labor Party in 2006. She has worked as a political staffer for several Labor MPs, serving as a senior adviser to Lindsay Tanner and Bill Shorten and later as chief of staff to Jenny Macklin. In September 2018, she won ALP preselection for the Division of Canberra, replacing the retiring MP Gai Brodtmann. Before her preselection, she was the vice-president of the Australian Labor Party (Australian Capital Territory Branch). Payne retained Canberra for her party at the 2019 federal election. She is factionally unaligned.

References

Australian Labor Party members of the Parliament of Australia
Members of the Australian House of Representatives
Members of the Australian House of Representatives for Canberra
Living people
Women members of the Australian House of Representatives
1982 births
People from Canberra
University of Sydney alumni
21st-century Australian women politicians
21st-century Australian politicians